Amityville: The Horror Returns is a 1989 horror novel and the fifth installment in Amityville book series written by John G. Jones. It is the final book to be about the Lutzes as they are stalked by the presence they fled from in Amityville.

Plot
A regular fine and dry day in southern California. George Lutz works on his new home while Kathy's sons Greg and Matt cause trouble inside. Kathy Lutz yells at them but it takes two parents to get them outside. George sits down to eat breakfast. A house fly comes out of nowhere and lands on his food. He goes to kill it but finds himself unable to move or speak. George then realizes the presence has found the Lutzes yet again. A fire monster is then led by the fly towards George Lutz after he manages to break free. Kathy wakes him up and he finds out he was dreaming, but he won't let it go. Kathy starts to cry. Her daughter Amy is about to comfort her mother when she hears a noise in the living room. She goes into the living room. She gets very happy and says "Jodie, you came back!". Still unaware of the presence in the house. George and Kathy go on a business trip to Portland, Oregon leaving the kids at home with the sitter, Nancy.

George and Kathy are stalked by the presence to Oregon where they encounter a little girl on a golf course. Things are much worse at home though. George and Kathy while on their way home are attacked by the presence on the plane. When George and Kathy reach the airport the presence does everything it can to prevent them from reaching the house where the kids and the sitter are. When they find the car they race onto the Los Angeles freeway, where their car is wrecked (similar to Father Mancuso's car in The Amityville Horror). The cars on the freeway disappear and George loses control of the car. George and Kathy jump out just before the car runs off a cliff and becomes a piece of twisted metal. An Indian finds them and gives them his truck. George and Kathy take the truck and race towards the house. The Indian man walks over to the Lutzes destroyed car and destroys the evil cloud which took control of the car. The Car then disappears. George and Kathy turn onto their street and rush up to the end of the street to find their house is gone. In its place: A -story Dutch colonial house. Better known as 112 Ocean Ave. (or as it is called in the book The Amityville House.) George and Kathy stunned that their old house is in front of them and their children inside try not to panic. As they get out of the car the house "greets" them. The lights start going on and off in one room at a time and slowly. Then they go off at the same time and even faster. Until every light goes out for a moment. Then very slowly an orange light illuminates the eye windows. The street then turns into Ocean Ave.

George tells Kathy that they must go in together and save the children and sitter. Shawna races to the house and sees George and Kathy entering the house. She races faster and slams into an invisible force field. George hears the crash but it sounds far away to him. George realizes the boat house is missing and is replaced by moving shadows. George goes to open the door to the house but finds it is locked. He tries using his key but it does not open. The door then opens. Inside is a demonic figure welcoming them into the house. Shawna, becomes able to escape her wrecked vehicle however she then realizes the house is gone. The Lutz family's regular house is back. She realizes it's artificial though and realizes she can't get to the house. Inside, the house (which is now a living thing) begins to talk to them. Using doors, windows, boilers it speaks to them. The house is in the condition it was in when they left it Christmas decorations are still up, gifts are lying around. George, who is now filled with anger, decides to fight back. He starts banging the wall hard with his fist. The activity stops for a few moments.

George tells Kathy to go find the kids and Nancy. Kathy runs up the stairs looking for the kids. She finds them. The house which has now "upgraded" the items the Lutz family left in the house. Kathy enters Amy's old room. Greg and Matt are sitting on the bed. Kathy tries to communicate with them but they give her no response. Kathy realizes Amy is dancing to music that is coming from nowhere. She then realizes Jodie is dancing with Amy. Every time Amy dances into a cabinet it moves, only she is not strong enough to move it. George downstairs is still fighting the creature. He then demands to know where Nancy is. The creature stops. Then says "Nan-cy?". George realizes the creature is Nancy. The creature then melts. Kathy upstairs is trying to find a way to make Jodie release the children without harming them. The dancing starts getting wilder and violent.

Shawna who still has not gotten into the house is outside. Using Indian powers she breaks the invisible wall. Exposing the Amityville house. In the living room the creature reforms. It is now pure white with no face. It grabs the "upgraded" shot gun, which shoots supernatural powers instead of bullets. George then demands the house to tell him where everyone is. It responds by telling him in the basement. He starts moving towards the basement. Then he realizes that's where the red room is. He turns around and unexpectedly attacks the demonic figure. Upstairs Kathy yells at Jodie which makes matters worse. She then yells at Amy to stop dancing. Amy drops to the ground. Greg and Matt then begin clapping. Shawna who is now walking up to the house just dodges rifle fire from inside the house. George is still fighting for the gun in the living room. It then gets worse when the figure gains the upper hand. Shawna bursts in the house to draw the attention to her.

Leaving a knocked out George on the floor. Kathy who now has to push the kids to walk gets them to the stairs when she hears a creaking noise. She sees the rocking chair moving. Amy then asks if Jodie could go with them. Kathy denies and the trio works the way down the stairs. In the dining room Shawna is being burnt alive by demonic powers. She manages to use some Indian powers to counter but continues to fail. Kathy realizes what is happening downstairs and goes to get the kids out of the house and come back.

Film
A film was originally going to be made but was canceled for unknown reasons. The back of the book states "Soon to be an NBC movie". The only Amityville film made for NBC was Amityville 4 which came out in 1989. 

The Amityville Horror
1989 novels
1980s horror novels
Novels set in California
American horror novels